Protomelas triaenodon is a species of cichlid native to the southern portion of Lake Malawi, Lake Malombe and the Shire River.  This species can reach a length of  TL.  It can also be found in the aquarium trade.

References

triaenodon
Fish of Lake Malawi
Fish of Malawi
Fish described in 1935
Taxonomy articles created by Polbot